The Lost Files: Unheard Songs from the Past  is a compilation album by R&B singer Donell Jones. It was released on November 24, 2009 through Candyman Music Inc and TuneCore. Comprising a collection of unreleased songs that were recorded between 1996 and 2004, serving as a prelude to his next studio album Lyrics (2010).

Track listing 
"Free" - 2:13
"Superman" - 4:37
"Badboy" - 3:15
"Marry Me" - 2:46
"Forever" - 5:50
"Sergeant Louise" - 4:15
"I'm Gonna Be (Reggae Remix)" - 5:19
"Assville" - 3:13
"Groove On" - 4:53
"Allnight" - 2:45
"Stressin" - 2:37

References 

2009 albums
Donell Jones albums